All visitors to Madagascar are required to get a visa to enter the country. Besides getting visa from an embassy or consulate in advance, foreign visitors can also obtain visa online or on arrival. In addition, they must hold a passport valid for six months and return or onward ticket.

Visa on arrival and eVisa
Nationals of any country except Burundi and Palestine (as Admission refused) can apply for a visa online or obtain a visa on arrival. The visa is good for single entry and available for stays up to 30, 60 or 90 days. eVisa application must be submitted at least three days before departure.

Visa fee:

Palestine
Entry and transit is refused to  passport holders.

Visitor statistics
Most non-resident visitors arriving to Madagascar were from the following countries of nationality:

See also

Visa requirements for Malagasy citizens

References 

Madagascar
Foreign relations of Madagascar